Gyorgy Bp. Szabo (born September 30, 1953 in Budapest) is a designer and musician.

Education
1982 Gyorgy Bp. Szabo received his MFA from the Moholy-Nagy University Of Art And Design Budapest. He then got his Masters in Typography. His Professors included Sandor Ernyei, Janos Kass, Peter Viragvolgyi and the legendary Ernő Rubik, the inventor of the Rubik's Cube. As a graphic designer he designed posters, mostly representing alternative bands.

Career
In 1992, he became the co-owner of A.R.C. Studio, and in 1994 started his own graphic design company called Bp. Studio. In 1996 he moved to Los Angeles to work for the well- known animation company Klasky Csupo where he became an art director. In 2004 he worked for Crew Creative, and finally landed the position of Creative Director at Cleopatra Records. His art reflects the way music and art collide. From 1983, his band Bp. Service has reflected the sound of accidental noise discoveries, machines, and the sound of the city along with self-made generators, resulting in uniquely innovative music. His Art reflecting to the pulse of city life; an expression of the rhythms of post modern recycled urban street art, balancing atmospheric dreams and ambient reality. These creations reflect an Eco friendly way to recreate disposed objects into art pieces that are, in essence, a collection of junk.

Important exhibitions

Own exhibitions
 2020 – Exhibition, Tér-Kép Gallery, Budapest
2016 – Mű[talált]tárgyak, Liget Gallery, Budapest
2014 – Double Sans, Erlin Gallery, Budapest
2013 – Elllenkultura a 80-as evekben, BTM, Budapest Gallery, Budapest
 2010 – Budapest-Los Angeles 1995-2010 Budapest Gallery. Budapest
 2003 – Elements, Klasky Csupo Gallery, Los Angeles
 2001 – Collections, Klasky Csupo Gallery, Los Angeles
 1995 – Conserved Soundprints, Kunst Halle, Budapest
 1994 – Deep Signals Skrached by Crystal, Mu terem Gallery, Budapest
 1993 – Soundprint, Young Artist Club, Budapest
 1988 – Radiating Devices, Young Artist Club, Budapest
 1987 – URBANCONCERTPOSTERS, Liget Galeria, Budapest
 1987 – Radiating Devices, Fenyes Adolf Terem, Budapest
 1987 – Ferencvarosi Pincetarlat, Budapest

Group exhibitions

2022 – Smaller Worlds, Ludwig Museum, Budapest
2020 – Unicef LuppArt, Brody House, Budapest
2020 – Szentendre's Plein Air Exhibition, Róma
2019 – Bestiárium, Rugógyár Galéria, Budapest
2018 – Talált Pixelek, Ferenczy Múzeum Barcsay terme, Szentendre
2017 – Pokoli Aranykor, Kieselbach Galéria, Budapest
2017 – Ihlet, Vajda Lajos Stúdió, Szentendre
2017 – AntiHangszer kiállítás, Vajda Lajos Stúdió, Szentendre 
2017 – 100 Éves a Dada, Vajda Lajos Stúdió, Szentendre
2017 – Dobozterek, Magán(y)gyűjtemények, D17 Galéria, Budapest
2016 – Akkumulátor, Budapest Galéria, Budapest
2016 – Making Music Modern: Design for Ear and Eye, MoMA, New York
 2015 – Fény, Nádor Galéria, Budapest
2014 – Art Show and Performance, gGallery Galéria, Los Angeles
2014 – Art Show and Performance, gGallery Galéria, Los Angeles
2014 – Studiofive08 Gallery, Los Angeles
2014 – Art Show & Performance, gGallery, Los Angeles
 2013 – Art Show & Performance, The Hive Gallery, Los Angeles
 2013 – Art Show & Performance, gGallery, Los Angeles
 2013 – Encore: Angel, 2nd Friday Art@TCSB, Santa Barbara
 2013 – Studiofive08 Gallery, Los Angeles
 2012 – Bull Show, 2nd Friday Art@TCSB, Santa Barbara
 2012 – Art Show & Performance, gGallery, Los Angeles
 2012 – Art Show & Performance, The Hive Gallery, Los Angeles
 2011 – Seeing through the eyes of the Mona Lisa, Arena 1 Gallery, Los Angeles
 2011 – Art Show & Performance, Hive Gallery, Los Angeles
 2010 – Art Show & Performance, The Hive Gallery, Los Angeles
 2010 – Art Show, Cannibal Flower Art Gallery, Los Angeles
 2009 – Art Show & Performance, The Hive Gallery, Los Angeles
 2008 – Art Show, Cannibal Flower Art Gallery, Los Angeles
 2008 – Art Show & Performance, The Hive Gallery, Los Angeles
 2005 – Art Regained, Art Pool, P60, Budapest,
 2001 - International Hanger Show, Hungarian Consulate, New York
 2001 - International Hanger Show, 2B Gallery, Budapest
 1997 – Lumpy Gravy, Art Bistro and Gallery, Los Angeles
 1996 – Studio of Lajos Vajda, Szentendre
 1994 – Mirelite City, Tilos az A, Budapest
 1993 –Late Naive, Conserved Soundprint 5, Jatekszín, Budapest
 1992 – Polypoezis, Hungarian-Italian Culture Academy
 1991 – Test-ek, Budapest Gallery, Budapest
 1991 – Noise Installation, fare well to Budapest
 1990 – The Signs of Change, posters 1988–1990, Hungarian National Gallery, Budapest
 1988 – Mechanical, Radnoti Stage
 1987 – Stamp Pictures, Museum on Fine Arts, Budapest
 1987 – Sound Therapy and Sound Maneuvers, Pinceszinhaz, Budapest
 1986 – Yellow Exhibition, Young Artist Club, Budapest
 1985 – Art Nouveau and New Wave, Rome
 1985 – Ferencvarosi, Pincetarlat, Budapest
 1985 – Soundprints, Fényes Adolf  Terem, Budapest
 1985 – Studio of your Artists Exhibition, Ernst Múzeum, Budapest
 1984 – Hungary Could be Yours, Young Artist Club, Budapest
 1983 – Today's Hungarian Graphics and Art, The Hungarian National Gallery, Budapest
 1980 – Resume, Young Artist Club, Budapest
 1980 – Visual Experiments,  Moholy-Nagy University Of Art And Design, Budapest
 1976 – National Graphics, Biennálé, Varsó

Press
 Szkárosi E.: Zajlátvány, Élet és Irodalom, 1995. November 3.
 Bogácsi E.: Zenél az asztallap is. Beszélgetés Bp. Szabó Györggyel, Népszabadság, 1996. január 16.
 Szkárosi E.: Mi az, hogy Avantgárd, Írások az avantgárd hagyománytörténetéből, 2006
 Carolyn Blais: The Hive + Temple of Visions Opening Night – Forth Magazine, January 21, 2010
 Dr. Máriás: A nagyvárosi Lét Vibrációi – A38, December 2010
 Eszter Götz: Szemétköltészet - Bp. Szabó György, December 4, 2010
 Judit Gellér: Out Of Use – Bp. Szabó György, 2010
 Dr.Máriás: Gyémántok a klotyóból – Élet és Irodalom, January 7, 2011
 D. Udvary Ildikó: Találatok - Egyenlítő, April 20, 2011
 Pallag Zoltán: Tűrt trash, tiltott trash, támogatott trash, Új Művészet, 2013

Concerts/Shows
 1997 – Electronic Noise Theater, Roxy Club, Los Angeles
 1996 – Impala Cafe Presents, Electric Thursday, Los Angeles
 1997 – Sneak-Preview Open House, Los Angeles
 1997 – Electronic Noise & Soundscape, Lumpy Gravy, Los Angeles
 1995 – Conserved Soundprint, Kunst Halle, Budapest
 1995 – Skulpture Hall of Kunst Halle, Budapest
 1995 – Noise Theater 3, MU Theater, Budapest
 1994 – A is Forbidden, Budapest
 1994 – Sound Manoeuver, Dalmat Basement, Szentedre
 1994 – Noise Theater 2, MU Theater, Budapest
 1993 – Noise Theater 1, MU Theater, Budapest
 1993 – Late Naive, Conserved Soundprint 5, Játékszín, Budapent
 1993 – Needs Solve, Conserved Soundprints 3, Pecs
 1993 – Soundprint, Young Artist Club, Budapest
 1992 – Polypoezis, Italian-Hungarian Club, Budapest
 1992 – Concert In the Factory, Pecs
 1992 – New Ladyrunner- Soundpoetry, Szentendre
 1990 – Black Hole, Budapest
 1990 – MU Theater, Budapest
 1989 – Weekend Expansion, Greek Temple, Vac
 1989 – MU Theater, Budapest
 1989 – Independent, Obuda Theatre, Budapest
 1989 – Europakolo- Nightmare Tour, University Stage, Budapest
 1989 – Solidart- Mimifest, Young Artists Club, Budapest
 1989 – Live Techno Pop Fest, Young Artists Club, Budapest
 1988 – Soundrays, Fényes Adolf Room, Budapest
 1988 – Alternative Club, Budapest
 1987 – Bp. Service, Concert at the Cave, Szentendre
 1986 – Almasi Ter, Free Time Center, Budapest
 1985 – Exhibition Band, Bercsenyi, Budapest
 1985 – Light Map, Petofi Hall, Budapest
 1985 – Cave Concert, Szentendre
 1985 – City After Shock Light Speed in the Shadow, Kassak Club, Budapest
 1984 – INKASZAMTAN University Stage, Budapest
 1984 – A platinum 84 Division C festival, Budapest
 1984 – Rigid Music Fest 5., Egyetemi Színpad, Budapest
 1984 – Noise Therapy and Sound Maneuver, Basement Theatre, Budapest
 1983 – Electric Petting, Budapest Culture Club, Budapest
 1983 – Underground Night, Kozgaz Club

Other Released Sound Material
 1985 – Enervated Tiny Draughts
 1988 – Post Vibration of a City in the Shadow of Lightwaves
 1990 – Bp. Service
 1990 – Solidart-Minifest, Industrial Alpinist
 1993 – Noise
 1995 – The Machines Print Soundmaps
 1997 – Deep Signal
 1998 – Self Acting Technology
 2005 – Plastic Alligator / Gyorgy Bp. szabo

References

External links
Bp. Szabó György Official website

Living people
1953 births